The 25th Toronto Film Critics Association Awards, honoring the best in film for 2021, were announced on January 16, 2022. Drive My Car and The Lost Daughter received the most awards with three wins each, with the former receiving the Best Picture award. The ceremony was held on March 7, 2022.

Winners
The winners are listed first and in bold, followed by the runner-ups.

Special awards
 TFCA Emerging Critic Award – Rachel Ho
 Jay Scott Prize – Bretten Hannam
 Clyde Gilmour Award – David Cronenberg
"Pay it forward" - Kelly Fyffe-Marshall

References

2021
2021 film awards
2021 in Toronto
2021 in Canadian cinema